Musab Saad, better known by his stage name Sab the Artist, Musab, or Beyond, is an American recording artist, rapper, songwriter, record producer, and music executive from Minneapolis, Minnesota. He is currently based in Las Vegas, Nevada.

Career
Known first by the moniker Beyond and later as Musab, Sab the Artist was a member of the Headshots crew before he, along with Slug (Sean Daley), Ant (Anthony Davis) and Siddiq (Brent Sayers), founded indie hip hop label Rhymesayers Entertainment. In 1996, Beyond had the label's very first release Comparison. In 1999, he released Be-Sides. Dynospectrum's self-titled debut album was also released that year. In 2002, Respect the Life, his first studio album as Musab, was released on Rhymesayers.

The 2007 album Slicks Box was Sab's first official project not released by Rhymesayers, instead coming on Oakland-based Hieroglyphics Imperium Recordings.

Long known as a hip hop artist, Sab's recent projects—including his 2010 EP Sab the Artist and the full-length album H.G.H. (Heaven, Girls, Hell) he worked with Ultra Chorus of Minneapolis—are instead a fusion of "Hip Hop, Pop, R&B, and Electronic sounds".

Discography

Albums
 Comparison (1996) (as Beyond)
 Dynospectrum (1999) (with Dynospectrum as General Woundwart)
 Be-Sides (1999) (as Beyond)
 Respect the Life (2002) (as Musab)
 Slicks Box (2007) (as Sab the Artist)
 Love Is in the Air (2011) (as Sab the Artist)
 HGH (Heaven, Girls, Hell) (2012) (as Sab the Artist with Ultra Chorus)
Deconstruction (2020) (as MInk with Ink Well)

EPs
 Actin' Rich (1999) (as Musab)
 Sab the Artist EP (2010)
 The Awful Truth (2012) (as Musab with Abstract Rude)

Guest appearances
 Atmosphere – "Current Status" and "Adjust" from Overcast! (1997)
 The Planets – "Global" from The Opening (2002)
 Atmosphere – "Flesh (Remix)" (2002)
 Atmosphere – "Southsiders Remix" (2014)
Atmosphere – "Earring" from Mi Vida Local (2018)
Atmosphere - "Strung" from Word? (2021)

References

External links
  – Rhymesayers Entertainment
 
 

Year of birth missing (living people)
Musicians from Minneapolis
Living people
African-American rappers
American hip hop record producers
American people who self-identify as being of Native American descent
21st-century American rappers
Rhymesayers Entertainment
Rhymesayers Entertainment artists
21st-century African-American musicians